Syrdarya–Turkestan State Regional Natural Park is a nature preserve in the Turkistan Region of Kazakhstan, which opened on September 5, 2012.

History 
The Syrdarya–Turkestan State Regional Natural Park was established to protect ecosystems, archaeological sites, and historical-cultural monuments, as well as plants and animal species, some of which are rare or endangered. The park was established in 2010, and opened on September 5, 2012; through the merger of three existing state parks within Arys, Boralday, and Turkistan. The goal was to prioritize the Syr Darya river plain, in order to further protect the wildlife of the area. Additionally the Syr Darya river irrigates the many of the agricultural regions in the whole of Central Asia. The area of the park is 120,000 hectares (roughly 296,526 acres). The total area of the park is divided into 4 functional zones – a protected area, an ecological stabilization zone, a zone of tourist and recreational activities, and a zone of limited economic activity.

About 955 species of plants grow in the park, among which 40 species are listed in the Red Book of the Republic of Kazakhstan, a government published book of rare and endangered species within the country. The fauna of the park includes about 382 species of birds and animals. 109 of them are listed in the Red Book of Kazakhstan. One of the attractions of the park is the only nursery in the Republic of Kazakhstan to restore the population of Bactrian deer (also known as Bukhara deer). The park has 25 species of bed bugs, from 8 taxonomy families have been found and studied. The Tutybulak cave is located in within the park and has been studied for the archeology, specifically from the Stone Age.

It has become a site for ecological tourism. However in 2022, there have been concerns of the ecotourism causing environmental damage and pollution in the river.

See also 
 History of the central steppe
 Northern river reversal

References

External links 
 Official website

Turkistan Region
Protected areas of Kazakhstan
2012 establishments in Kazakhstan